Derrell Jaylen Warren (born November 1, 1998) is an American football running back for the Pittsburgh Steelers of the National Football League (NFL). He played college football at Snow College, Utah State and Oklahoma State.

College career
Warren played college football at Snow College, Utah State and Oklahoma State. As a senior at Oklahoma State, he rushed for 1,216 yards and 11 touchdowns.

Statistics

Professional career

Warren signed with the Pittsburgh Steelers as an undrafted free agent in 2022. Following an impressive training camp and preseason, Warren made the final roster on August 31, 2022.

NFL career statistics

References

External links
Pittsburgh Steelers bio
Oklahoma State Cowboys bio
Utah State Aggies bio
Snow College Badgers bio

1998 births
Living people
People from Clinton, North Carolina
Players of American football from North Carolina
American football running backs
Snow Badgers football players
Utah State Aggies football players
Oklahoma State Cowboys football players
Pittsburgh Steelers players